The Indonesian Grand Prix was an open-wheel racing car motor race, held intermittently as motorsport ambitions varied in Indonesia.

History
Held originally at the Jaya Ancol Circuit near Jakarta in 1976 as part of the burgeoning Rothmans International Grand Prix Trophy series for Formula Pacific open wheelers, the race was discontinued after the inaugural event. While motorcycle racing continued to enjoy support in Indonesia, car racing fluctuated. The early 1980s saw a burst of enthusiasm import some Australian teams briefly in a demonstration but no race eventuated.

Finally a second Grand Prix was held in 1993 for the Australian Formula Brabham category. It was planned as a demonstration for attracting the Formula 1 world championship and a mixed grid of locals (including one Tommy Suharto) and Australian drivers raced at Sentul International Circuit. The experienced Australians dominated with Mark Larkham claiming victory in a Reynard 91D. Sentul was too small for Formula One and the money to build a circuit never appeared and the race disappeared again.

Winners of the Indonesian Grand Prix

References 

 
National Grands Prix
Recurring sporting events established in 1976
Grand Prix
1976 establishments in Indonesia